King's Highway 7, commonly referred to as Highway 7 and  historically as the Northern Highway, is a provincially maintained highway in the Canadian province of Ontario. At its peak, Highway 7 measured  in length, stretching from Highway 40 east of Sarnia in Southwestern Ontario to Highway 17 west of Ottawa in Eastern Ontario. However, due in part to the construction of Highways 402 and 407, the province transferred the sections of Highway 7 west of London and through the Greater Toronto Area to county and regional jurisdiction.

Highway 7 was first designated in 1920 between Sarnia and Guelph and extended to Brampton the following year. Between 1927 and 1932, the highway was more than doubled in length as it was gradually extended eastward to Perth, where Highway 15 continued to Ottawa via Carleton Place. In the early 1960s, that section of Highway 15 was renumbered as Highway 7. In that same decade, the Conestoga Parkway through Kitchener and the Peterborough Bypass were constructed. During the 1970s and 1980s, many sections of Highway 7 were widened from the initial two lane cross-section to four or six lanes. Within part of York Region, the route was upgraded to a limited-access expressway in preparation for the construction of Highway 407.

Soon thereafter, that new tollway would act as justification for transferring the section of Highway 7 through the Greater Toronto Area (GTA) to regional governments. The sections became Peel Regional Road 107 Bovaird Drive West to Highway 410 and Queen Street East from east of 410 respectively) and York Regional Road 7. In the west, the construction of Highway 402 between Sarnia and London provided an uninterrupted alternative to Highway 7, resulting in the transfer of the section west of Highway 4. A third transfer took place in Peterborough, briefly separating the route into three discontinuous segments, but has since been rectified by renumbering a section of Highway 7A. From 2007 to 2012, the section of Highway 7 between Carleton Place and Ottawa has been widened to a divided freeway. In addition, work is underway to extend the Conestoga Parkway to New Hamburg as well as to build a new freeway between Kitchener and Guelph.

Route description

Western segment 
A  portion of this segment, from Waterloo Regional Road 51 south of Baden to Highway 85 in Kitchener is a freeway, forming part of the Conestoga Parkway. Plans to build a freeway bypass of Highway 7 from Kitchener to Guelph are currently underway.

At one point Highway 7 travelled as far west as Sarnia, being the main route to the Blue Water Bridge. Upon entering Sarnia from the east on London Line, drivers encountered a plethora of motels and restaurants, the Sarnia Airport, and attractions such as Hiawatha Racetrack and Waterpark, earning the stretch between Modeland Road and Airport Road the nickname of the "Golden Mile". At the interchange with Highway 40, Highway 7 transitioned into the Highway 402 freeway which continued westwards to the Bluewater Bridge at the American border. Highway 402 was completed between Sarnia and Highway 401 in 1982,
resulting in the redundancy of Highway 7 west of London as traffic shifted to the high-speed alternate. This work involved the realigning of Highway 402 to a new interchange with Highway 40, just north of the existing Highway 7/Highway 40 interchange where Highway 7 would continue to a redirected Exmouth Street. Nonetheless, Highway 7 remained provincially maintained until the segment west of Highway 4 was transferred to county jurisdiction on January 1, 1998; a process referred to as downloading. The former highway is now known as Lambton County Road 22 (London Line) and Middlesex County Road 7 (Elginfield Road).

Though the highway changes direction several times between Elginfield and Kitchener, it is mostly straight and two lanes wide, except east of New Hamburg where it widens to four lanes. Proceeding east-northeast through farmland, the highway meets the southern terminus of Highway 23 just  later. It continues, serving as the boundary between Lucan Biddulph to the north and Middlesex Centre to the south, and later as the boundary between Perth County to the north and Middlesex and Oxford counties, with the tripoint of the three at County Road 120A south of St. Marys. Southeast of St. Marys, Highway 7 curves northeast into Perth County until it reaches downtown Stratford, where it meets Highway 8.

Southwest of New Hamburg, the route curves northeast into Waterloo Region, eventually widening into the four-lane Conestoga Parkway east of Nafziger Road. It follows this divided freeway past interchanges at Waterloo Regional Road 51 (Foundry Street) south of Baden, Waterloo Regional Road 12 (Queen Street/Notre Dame Drive) south of Petersburg, and Waterloo Regional Road 70 (Trussler Road) north of Mannheim, where it enters Kitchener and becomes surrounded by residential subdivisions. Within Kitchener, Highway 7 encounters interchanges at Waterloo Regional Road 58 (Fischer-Hallman Road)(at which point it widens to six lanes), Waterloo Regional Road 28 (Homer Watson Boulevard), Waterloo Regional Road 53 (Courtland Avenue), Waterloo Regional Road 15 (King Street)/Highway 8 (at which point it widens to eight lanes), Waterloo Regional Road 14 (Ottawa Street) and Waterloo Regional Road 55 (Victoria Street). The Highway 8 concurrency ends at the King Street interchange, with it diverging southeast onto the Freeport Diversion. Highway 7 exits at Victoria Street (four-lane arterial) while the parkway continues north into Waterloo as Highway 85. Construction began in June 2015 on a future freeway between Kitchener and Guelph that will make use of a reconfigured Wellington Street interchange, just north of Victoria Street, and tie in with the northern end of the Hanlon Expressway.

Highway 7 exits Kitchener after crossing the Grand River, where it enters farmland again for the brief  journey to Guelph along Victoria Street and Woodlawn Road. Midway between the two cities, the route enters Wellington County. Within Guelph, it meets Highway 6 at the northern end of the Hanlon Expressway. The two routes travel southeast along the expressway to Wellington County Road 124 (Wellington Street, former Highway 24), where Highway 7 branches northeast into downtown Guelph. It exits the city along York Road after crossing the Speed River, travelling parallel to and south of the Goderich–Exeter Railway. At Rockwood, the highway enters Halton Region and begins to zig-zag through several communities in Halton Hills. These include Acton, where the route intersects former Highway 25, and Georgetown. Just east of Norval, the western section of Highway 7 ends at the Halton–Peel boundary. The road continues into Brampton as Peel Regional Road 107 (Bovaird Drive). The former highway then followed Highway 410 south, where it continued east along Queen Street (also Peel Road 107).

The western segment was separated from the rest of Highway 7 on June 7, 1997, when the section from Brampton to Markham was downloaded due to the opening of Highway 407. Part of that segment through Vaughan and Richmond Hill was relocated on a new alignment (as a 6 lane at-grade expressway) in 1987 in order to make way for the future toll route (where the two highways were forced to share a narrow corridor due to development) and to eliminate a jog along Bathurst Street; which also resulted in a section from west of Dufferin Street becoming a westerly extension of Centre Street. Sections of the original road still remain between Bathurst Street and Bayview Avenue, but have been renamed as Langstaff Road. Highway 7 through York Region, despite being a suburban arterial and no longer a provincial highway, is still officially named "Highway 7", but otherwise has no street name, and received the number York Regional Road 7, displacing Islington Avenue which was redesignated as Regional Road 17. Parts of the Markham portion were once called Wellington Street as well as sideroad allowance (before 1925 when Highway 7 reached the area), stub of the old road exists today west of Markham Road that was a result of re-alignment of Highway 7. The Toronto Star ran a series of articles in 2013 depicting the urbanization of the former route. Among the issues was a proposed name change to "Avenue 7".

Eastern segment 
Between Brooklin and north of Sunderland, Highway 7 assumes a north–south routing and is concurrent with Highway 12. The section from Sunderland to the eastern terminus of the highway is designated as part of the Central Ontario Route of the Trans-Canada Highway.

Travelling east from Donald Cousens Parkway, Highway 7 exits the urbanized portion of Markham and enters the Greenbelt, a large tract of land north of the GTA restricted from development. It curves north at the community of Locust Hill along an alignment that eliminated a jog, then curves back to the east as it crosses into Durham Region. It travels north of and parallel to Highway 407 to Brougham, curving to cross the former eastern terminus of the freeway near Brock Road (Durham Regional Road 1). East of the Highway 407 overpass, Highway 7 widens to four lanes and curves around the community of Greenwood and the hill that it stands on. The route crosses the northern end of Pickering, entering Whitby at Lakeridge Road (Durham Regional Road 23). Between Lakeridge Road and Highway 12, the route was rebuilt for the new Highway 407E and West Durham Link, with an overpass constructed at Cochrane Road. East of that, the route enters Brooklin and meets Highway 12.

Highway 7 and Highway 12 travel north concurrently from Brooklin through Durham Region to Sunderland, with Highway 7 eventually departing to the east and entering the City of Kawartha Lakes. Despite its name, the highway passes through a mostly-rural landscape in Kawartha Lakes, bypassing south of Lindsay in the middle of the "city" along a brief concurrency with Highway 35. East of Lindsay, the route meanders southeast towards Peterborough, encountering the divided freeway Highway 115 southwest of the city. The two routes travel east concurrently along the southern edge of the city. Highway 115 and the divided freeway end at Lansdowne Street, onto which Highway 7 turns.

The segment between Peterborough and Perth was built in the 1930s during the Great Depression, as a public works employment project. It was constructed parallel to a CP Rail corridor (now abandoned east of Peterborough) that was built in the 1880s, and used hand-power to dig and build the road whenever possible. From Peterborough to Norwood, the route travels in a straight line through the Peterborough Drumlin Field, connecting to the southern terminus of Highway 28 and crossing the Indian River while otherwise passing through farmland. At Norwood the route suddenly begins to meander as it approaches the undulated Canadian Shield. The section east of Havelock to Perth, unlike the rest of the highway, travels through a relatively isolated area, with few services or residences along the route outside of the several towns that it connects. In contrast to the surroundings west of there, this section is located in dense forest with numerous lakes and muskeg dotting the landscape. It services the villages of Marmora, where it connects with the northern terminus of former Highway 14, Madoc, where it intersect Highway 62, Actinolite, where it meets the northern terminus of Highway 37, and Kaladar, where it intersects Highway 41.

East of Kaladar, Highway 7 begins to serve cottages along the shores of several large lakes that lie near the highway. It intersects the northern terminus of former Highway 38 near Sharbot Lake and later passes south of Maberly before exiting the Canadian Shield and reentering farmland. On the outskirts of Perth, the route meets former Highway 43 and curves northward. It travels around the western and northern shorelines of Mississippi Lake before passing directly south of Carleton Place. Just east of there, Highway 7 widens into a four lane freeway for the remainder of the distance to Highway 417. This section, completed by early 2012, was built by "twinning" the existing two lane highway with a second parallel carriageway to serve as the eastbound lanes. Highway 7 ends at an interchange with Highway 417, where drivers can proceed east to Ottawa or north to Arnprior.

History 
The route which would later become Highway 7 was first established by the Department of Public Highways as part of the initial provincial highway network on February26, 1920. This route connected Sarnia to Guelph.
On April 27, 1921, the route was extended east to the Wellington–Halton boundary. Several days later, on May 4, the highway was extended further east to Hurontario Street in Brampton.
The Great Northern Highway, as it was known at the time, was numbered as Highway 7 during the summer of 1925.
Assumptions on June 22 and July 2, 1927 extended Highway 7 from Brampton to Peterborough. A portion of the original routing of Highway 12 between Sunderland and Lindsay was renumbered in this process and a concurrency established between Brooklin and Sunderland.

During the early 1930s, the DHO decided that Highway 7 would ultimately serve as an alternative route between Toronto and Ottawa; at that time the only option was via Highway 2 and Highway 16. The first step in this undertaking was to extend Highway 7 as far as Madoc along existing settler routes. This section was assumed on September 17, 1930.
On November 18, 1931, construction was accelerated between Madoc and Perth as a major depression-relief project when eight contracts were set to build the new route. Over 2700 men blasted rock, dredged muskeg and endured a constant barrage of blood-sucking insects in order to construct this new link. The majority of it followed along a Canadian Pacific right-of-way (now abandoned past the town of Havelock) which had been cleared in 1881, deviating at times to provide a better alignment, avoid large muskeg or to lessen excavation work, most of which was performed by hand.
On February 10 and February 17, the route, still incomplete, was surveyed and assumed as an extension of Highway 7. The new highway was opened to traffic on August 23, 1932.

Between the 1930s and 1960s, Highway 7 connected Sarnia with Perth; Highway 15 continued from Perth to Ottawa. By the mid-1950s, the well established highway network had changed travel characteristics, and the numbering of Highway 15 between Perth and Ottawa was confusing motorists. The Ottawa Board of Trade petitioned the Department of Highways to renumber several highways surrounding the city.
The department performed a series of renumberings similar to these recommendations following the extension of Highway 43 on September 8, 1961. Highway 15 was rerouted between Smiths Falls and Carleton Place to travel concurrently with Highway 29; Highway 7 was extended along the former routing from Perth to Carleton Place and signed concurrently with Highway 15 eastward to Ottawa.

Transfer of portions to lower governments (downloading) 
In the late 1990s and early 2000s, the Ministry of Transportation (MTO) "downloaded" (i.e., transferred responsibility for) several sections of Highway 7 to regional and county governments. There are three separate issues that led to these downloads.

Due to budget cuts instituted by the Mike Harris government, many highways deemed to serve a local or regional function were downloaded to local jurisdiction. The sections of Highway 7 west of London were transferred to Lambton County and Middlesex County, largely supplanted by the completion of nearby Highway 402 in 1982. On April 1, 1997, the section from Sarnia to Thedford was transferred to Lambton County.
The section from Thedford to Elginfield was transferred to Lambton and Middlesex counties on January 1, 1998.

As the construction of Highway 407 progressed across the northern end of the Greater Toronto Area, the MTO transferred sections of Highway 7 to the regions of Peel and York. On June 7, 1997, the section between Highway 410 and Highway 404 was transferred to the regions of Peel and York; the section from Highway 404 to McCowan Road was transferred to York Region on April 1, 1999. Several months later, on September 1, a short section between McCowan Road and Markham Road was transferred. Within Peel Region, Highway 410 and Highway 7 ran concurrently north–south between Bovaird Drive and Queen Street. The Queen St. portion of the route was numbered Peel Regional Road 21 on July 10, 1997, but renumbered as Peel Regional Road 107 on March 26, 1998. To make the former highway easier to follow through Brampton, the Bovaird Drive portion of the route was subsequently also numbered Regional Road 107, after the highway was transferred to the Region of Peel on November 28, 2001.
The non-Highway 7 portions of Queen Street and Bovaird Drive west and east of Highway 410 are designated as Regional Roads 6 and 10 respectively.

In the Peterborough area, Highway 7 was rerouted from travelling through the city to bypassing it along Highway 115. This situation took over six years to set in place. On April 1, 1997, the sections of Highway 7 entering the western edge of Peterborough along North Monaghan Parkway and Sir Sanford Fleming Drive were transferred to the county and city, creating a gap between Springville and the Peterborough Bypass. This situation was rectified on May 1, 2003, when the section of Highway 7A that until then was a continuation of the road south from Springville to Highway 115 was renumbered as Highway 7. The concurrency with Highway 115 was extended southwest to remove the discontinuity entirely.

Recent work

York Region
In 2005, Highway 7 was made the second main arterial for York Region's Viva Rapid Transit service (after Yonge Street), leading to the expansion of the CN MacMillan Bridge and Highway 400 overpass.

Carleton Place
On August 22, 2006, work officially began on a project to expand Highway 7 between Ottawa and Carleton Place into a freeway through a process known as twinning,
in which a second carriageway is built parallel to an existing road and grade-separated interchanges constructed.
Plans for this expansion were first conceptualized in 1979 when a planning study was undertaken. However, budgetary constraints forced an early end to this study in 1981. In 1988, the project was reinstated. A study released that year recommended that Highway 7 be widened to five lanes with a centre turning lane south of Carleton Place as an interim measure; this was carried out in 1993. Full planning on the four-laning of the route began in 1993.

In mid-2005, the Government of Ontario announced the project to the public. The work was carried out over three contracts: from Highway 417 to Jinkinson Road, from Jinkinson Road to Ashton Station Road, and from Ashton Station Road to Highway 15. In July 2007, a C$45 million contract was awarded to R.W. Tomlinson for the first phase of the route west from Highway 417. Bot Construction was awarded the $73.2 million contract for the second phase, which included two interchanges, four overpasses and service roads, in early 2008. The first phase was opened to traffic on July 31, 2008 Towards the end of 2009, the $25.8 million contract for the third phase was awarded to Aecon Group. The second phase was completed ahead of schedule on December 3, 2008, bypassing south of the former route at Ashton Station Road and merging to two lanes west of Dwyer Hill Road. The third phase was completed in late 2011/early 2012, connecting to Carleton Place.

Future 
On March 23, 2007, the Government of Ontario announced the approval of an Environmental Impact Assessment for a four-lane controlled-access highway between Kitchener, and Guelph, as traffic on Highway 401 is growing steadily and approaching capacity, along with the current two-lane alignment of Highway 7. This would connect to the Conestoga Parkway via an expansion of the existing Wellington Road interchange, the new junction would be a four level interchange; the government's eventual plan is to have a Highway 7 freeway running from Stratford to Guelph. The eastern end of the proposed Highway 7 freeway would terminate at, and interline with, the Hanlon Expressway (Highway 6), which is also scheduled for upgrades to a full freeway beginning in June 2015.
   
In early 2011, Ontario Infrastructure Minister Bob Chiarelli hinted at possible plans to extend the four-laning of Highway 7 west from Carleton Place to Perth.

In July 2020, the Ford government announced that it would fund the highway project linking Guelph and Kitchener and building a new bridge for the highway over the Grand River. It is expected to cost 764 million dollars for the 18-kilometre freeway.

Major intersections

References

External links 

 Highway 7 at thekingshighway.ca

Canada NewsWire Press Release

007
Ontario 007
Carleton Place
Transport in Halton Hills
Kawartha Lakes
Roads in Brampton
Roads in Markham, Ontario
Roads in Ottawa
Transport in Guelph
Roads in Kitchener, Ontario
Transport in Peterborough, Ontario
Transport in Pickering, Ontario
Transport in Stratford, Ontario
Transport in Vaughan
Transport in Whitby, Ontario
Roads in the Regional Municipality of Waterloo